A hot runner system is an assembly of heated components used in plastic injection molds that inject molten plastic into the cavities of the mold. (The cavities are the part of the mold shaped like the parts to be produced.)

By contrast, a cold runner is simply a channel formed between the two halves of the mold, for the purpose of carrying plastic from the injection molding machine nozzle to the cavities. Each time the mold opens to eject the newly formed plastic parts, the material in the runner is ejected as well, resulting in waste. A hot runner system usually includes a heated manifold and a number of heated nozzles. The main task of the manifold is to distribute the plastic entering the mold to the various nozzles which then meter it precisely to the injection points in the cavities.

Hot runner advantages 
 Shorter cycle time: No runner controlling the cooling time
 Easier to start: Without runners to remove, and auto cycle occurs faster and more frequently
 Fewer sink marks and under-filled parts: Unlike when plastic flows through a cold runner and loses heat to mold plates
 Design flexibility: Can locate the gate at many points on the part
 Balanced melt flow: Separate melt channels are in externally heated manifolds that are insulated from mold plates surrounding them.
Hot runner systems were first developed and came into sporadic use in the early 60s with generally negative results. They gained popularity in the 80s and 90s as technological advancements allowed improved  reliability and the escalation of plastic materials prices made hot runner systems more desirable and cost effective. Hot runners are fairly complicated systems, they have to maintain the plastic material within them heated uniformly, while the rest of the injection mold is being cooled in order to solidify the product quickly. For this reason they are usually assembled from components pre manufactured by specialized companies. 

A hot runner controller is a temperature controller used to control the temperature in the hot runner. This helps  create the most consistent part(s).

Hot runners usually make the mold more expensive to manufacture and run, but allow savings by reducing plastic waste and by reducing the cycle time. (do not have to wait until the conventional runners freeze).

References

See also
Cartridge heater
Plastic Injection Molding

Plastics industry
Injection molding